Toubab Dialo (or Toubab Dialaw) is a village in Senegal, located on the Petite Côte, south of Dakar, between Bargny, Senegal and Popenguine. It is part of the rural community of Yenne, the department of Rufisque and the region of Dakar.

Geography
The nearest towns are Gorée, Yene Tode, Lela, Khobi, Kelle, Tiabla, Thilaw and Tilene.

History
According to legend - told by tourist guides - El Hadj Omar Tall (Omar Saidou Tall), founded the Toucouleurs Empire. He came to this village and caused a source of fresh water to spring up on the beach which was seen as miraculous.

Economy
A fishing village leaning against the cliff, Toubab Dialo is now turning to tourism, thanks to a peaceful environment conducive to swimming and walking.

Abdoul Rahim Ba is the founder of Biodialaw network in Toubab Dialaw. It is an "ecological oasis" that trains young people, women and communities in ecological organic farming techniques.

Culture
The village is home to the École des Sables, an international center for traditional and contemporary African dances created in 1998 and run by Senegalese choreographer Germaine Acogny. The school is a center for education, modern dance, traditional and contemporary African dances. Ben Beye a Senegalese director filmed parts of the film "Latricia's Dream" in Touba Dialaw at the École des Sables. 

The K'you is an art gallery with a guesthouse in Toubab Dialaw.

Gerard Chenet is an architect, writer, and the founder and designer of Espace Sobo Bade.  It is a place for cultural exchange. He was born in Haiti and came to Senegal in 1964. He founded Sobo Bade in 1970. Space Sobo Bade is a cultural centre, artists community, and a guesthouse.

Gallery

Population
The village had 2,210 inhabitants in 2003. In 2013, there were 2,915 people.
They are mainly Lebous, but Serer also live there.

Notable People
Gerard Chenet
Germaine Acogny

See also
Batik, drumming and dancing
School Des Sables
Omar Saidou Tall
Cities Outside of Dakar

References

External links
Toubab Dialaw 
Toubab Dialaw (stats)

Villages in Senegal
Populated places in Thiès Region
Rufisque
Petite Côte